Vladimir Oskarovich Kappel (– January 26, 1920) was a White Russian military leader.

Early life
Kappel was born into a Swedish-Russian family.

World War I
During the First World War of 1914-1918 Kappel was Chief of the 347th Infantry Regiment's Staff and an officer in the  1st Army's Staff. He began at the Staff of the Army Corps. In February 1915 he was transferred to the front at the headquarters of Fifth Division of Don Cossacks. He stayed at that post until his promotion to the rank of staff captain.

He participated in the planning of the Brusilov Offensive of 1916, the most successful  Russian offensive of the war.

On 15 August 1916, Vladimir Kappel was made lieutenant-colonel and posted Deputy Head of the Headquarters Operations Office for the  South-Western front.

Russian Civil War
Although he was a self-declared monarchist, Kappel said he would fight under any banner against the Bolsheviks. Kappel's adherents and allies were known in Russian as kappelevtsy (каппелевцы).

Following the Bolshevik Revolution, Kappel commanded the Komuch White Army group (People's Army of Komuch) (June–September 1918) and from December 1919 the eastern front of Aleksandr Kolchak's forces, participating in the Spring 1919 offensive towards Moscow.

Despite his rank, the young officer was often seen with grenades and revolvers on his belt, which earned him the reputation of a Soldier-General and made him one of the most popular White Generals among the rank-and-file. He insisted on arming all of his staff, and often carried his rifle to planning sessions. His relatively young age was also a contributing factor to his reputation as an effective general.

Despite the military prowess of Kappel and his troops, the Spring offensive failed: their supply lines were over-extended, their troops were meagre, ammunition shortages were common, and the Red Army was being reorganized and strengthened. As multiple revolts caused the Army's rear to disintegrate, Kolchak was captured by Soviet allies. Kappel and his Kappelevtsy thus began a forced march through the Siberian winter, the Great Siberian Ice March, similar to what the Volunteer Army had done in 1918, the Kuban Ice March.

During the march, on 15 January 1920, Kappel learnt of Kolchak's capture. Shortly afterwards he fell through the ice while crossing the Kan River, worsening his already fragile health. Because of frostbite, the fingers of his right hand had to be removed along with his left foot, without anesthetics. Following this amputation however, his health did not improve. Still advancing towards Irkutsk to rescue Kolchak, the General's troops captured Nizhneudinsk on the 20th. Both of Kappel's legs were frozen and he was dying of typhus.

In the words of his colleague and friend, A. A. Fedorovich: "He clenches his teeth to not scream out in pain. The general has been hoisted and attached to his horse with what is left of his hands and body. Vladimir greets those who have not laid down their weapons. And he only stops at night."

On the 21st, Kappel handed over command of his troops to General Sergei Wojciechowski due to his failing health. He also sent his wife his wedding ring and one of his Crosses of St. George. On the 22nd, on the verge of death, Kappel ordered his troops to accelerate their march towards Irkutsk, to save their gold reserves and Admiral Kolchak from execution. His last words to his men were: "Tell my men that I adored them, and that my death in the midst of them proves it."

His command was officially handed over to General Sergei Wojciechowski, who continued the advance towards Irkutsk. Kappel's men, bringing his coffin with them (to avoid desecration like with other White Generals' burial sites), reached the outskirts of the city on the 30th of January. Kolchak however, had been executed on the 6th or 7 February, shortly before they were to reach him. They then continued their retreat towards Chita, ending their Great Siberian Ice March there.

Legacy
Kappel's tomb in Harbin, China was pulled down in 1955 when Mao Zedong assumed power in China. On December 19, 2006, the remains of Kappel were identified and transported for reinterment from China to Irkutsk. On January 13, 2007, Vladimir Kappel's remains were interred at Donskoy Monastery in Moscow.

Honours and awards
 Order of Saint Stanislaus, 3rd class (11 April 1910), with swords and bow  (10 February 1916), 2nd class with Swords (7 June 1915)
 Order of St. Anna, 3rd class (8 May 1913 - for the successful completion of the Nicholas General Staff Academy), with swords and bow (25 April 1915), 2nd class with Swords (7 June 1915), 4th class with the inscription "For Bravery" (27 January 1916)
 Order of St. Vladimir, 4th class with Swords and Bow (1 March 1915)
 Order of St. George, 4th class (22 June 1919), 3rd class (11 September 1919)
 Gratitude of the Supreme Ruler and Supreme Commander (14 February 1919)

Footnotes

Further reading

 Каппель и каппелевцы. Kappel and Kappelevtsy, e-book.

1883 births
1920 deaths
People from Pushkin, Saint Petersburg
People from Tsarskoselsky Uyezd
Russian people of Swedish descent
Russian monarchists
White movement generals
Russian military personnel of World War I
Recipients of the Order of Saint Stanislaus (Russian), 2nd class
Recipients of the Order of St. George of the Third Degree
Recipients of the Order of St. Anna, 3rd class
Recipients of the Order of St. Vladimir, 4th class
Burials at Donskoye Cemetery